KRFT-LD, virtual channel 8 (UHF digital channel 21), is a low-powered Court TV-affiliated television station licensed to Springfield, Missouri, United States. Owned by Craft Broadcasting, it is a sister station to KXMP-LD in Harrison, Arkansas. The station mainly carries minor digital subchannel networks, and holds no area cable coverage.

Digital channels
The station's digital signal is multiplexed:

References

External links
 
 
 

Retro TV affiliates
RFT-LD
Television channels and stations established in 1992
Low-power television stations in the United States